Lecythothecium is a genus of fungi within the Chaetosphaeriaceae family. This is a monotypic genus, containing the single species Lecythothecium duriligni.

References

External links
Lecythothecium at Index Fungorum

Chaetosphaeriales
Monotypic Sordariomycetes genera